Miremont is the name or part of the name of the following communes in France:

 Miremont, Haute-Garonne, in the Haute-Garonne department
 Miremont, Puy-de-Dôme, in the Puy-de-Dôme department
 Mauzens-et-Miremont, in the Dordogne department
 Savignac-de-Miremont, in the Dordogne department